MS Moby Niki is a ro-ro passenger ferry owned and operated by Moby Lines between Livorno and Bastia, the ship was previously owned and operated by Corsica Ferries and before 1983, was operated by Lion Ferry and Stena Line for a short time after Lion Ferry was rebranded as Stena.

References

Ships built in Germany
1974 ships
Ferries of Italy